Cyberchrist is the second EP by Sphere Lazza, released in 1993 by Reactor Records.

Music
The song "Justified?" from Cyberchrist was released on Blood and Computers II: The Return of the Cyberpunks by Paradise Movement and later on the band third EP +incinerate and Electro Industrial Assassins by Cleopatra Records in 1995. The album was remastered and packaged with the band's next release, titled +incinerate, for the band's 1995 compilation album Incinerate on Fifth Colvmn Records.

Reception 
Sonic Boom called Cyberchrist "habitually addictive dance industrial" and said "very original work here, a bit of the deep background percussion is mildly reminiscent to older Front by Front area Front 242, but the comparison ends there."

Track listing

Personnel 
Adapted from the Cyberchrist liner notes.

Sphere Lazza
 Tony Spaz – instruments
 David Trousdale – vocals, instruments

Release history

References

External links 
 Cyberchrist at Discogs (list of releases)
 ''Cyberchrist' at iTunes

1993 EPs
Sphere Lazza albums